Missulena reflexa is a species of mygalomorph spiders in the family Actinopodidae. It is found in South Australia.

References

reflexa
Spiders described in 1918